Daughters of Darkness is a 1971 erotic horror film directed by Harry Kümel and starring Delphine Seyrig, Danielle Ouimet, John Karlen and Andrea Rau.

Plot
Stefan Chilton, the son of an aristocratic British family who was raised in the United States, is traveling with his newly-wed wife, Valerie, through Europe. The couple check into a grand hotel on the Ostend seafront in Belgium, intending to catch the cross-channel ferry to England, where Stefan's mother lives. Valerie notices that Stefan is reluctant to phone his mother, who is unaware of the couple's marriage. Because it is winter, the hotel is empty aside from Stefan and Valerie. At nightfall, a mysterious Hungarian countess, Elizabeth Báthory, arrives in a Bristol driven by her "secretary," Ilona. Elizabeth requests the royal suite, but the hotel's middle-aged concierge, Pierre, tells her it is occupied by the honeymooning couple. He also remarks having seen the countess at the same hotel when he was a child, and observes that she has not aged. Elizabeth takes the adjoining suite, and appears fixated on the young couple. In their suite, Valerie reads a local newspaper article about a series of child murders in Bruges, each a girl whose throat was slashed.

While walking through the city the following day, Valerie and Stefan stumble upon a newly-found crime scene of another murdered girl. Valerie is disturbed by Stefan's fascination with the crime. Back at the hotel, Elizabeth and Ilona acquaint themselves with Stefan and Valerie in the hotel lobby. During their conversation, a police officer appears at the hotel, and makes vague reference to having known Elizabeth years prior. She remains evasive to him. Elizabeth subsequently explains that she is a descendant of Erzsébet Báthory, and was named for her. She recounts the various violent acts that Bathory committed, particularly the murder and mutilation of young girls, whose blood she bathed in. Valerie is revulsed by the conversation, but Stefan appears to be sexually aroused by it. Stefan eventually agrees to phone his mother, who turns out to be a middle-aged, effeminate man. "Mother" scolds Stefan for getting married, but expresses curiosity at the prospect of meeting Valerie.

Later, Stefan beats Valerie in their hotel room, culminating in sadistic rape. The next day, Ilona seduces Stefan when Valerie attempts to leave Ostend. Elizabeth stops Valerie from leaving, and the two women spend the evening together discussing Valerie and Stefan's relationship. Elizabeth dissuades Valerie from remaining with Stefan, warning her that he will treat her as an inferior. Meanwhile, Stefan teases Ilona in the bathroom, and attempts to pull her into the shower. The two get into a tussle and slip and fall, causing Ilona to slash her hand on a razor before fatally falling on top of it. Valerie and Elizabeth return moments after, stumbling upon the scene. Elizabeth takes charge, ordering Valerie to clean up the blood while Stefan sits in shock, and the three subsequently drive into the country to dispose of Ilona's corpse.

After burying Ilona's body on the beach, the three return to the hotel at dawn. Valerie, under Elizabeth's spell, refuses to leave with Stefan. A violent fight ensues, during which Stefan's wrists are slashed by a broken bowl. As Stefan bleeds to death, Elizabeth and Valerie drink the blood pouring from his wounds. Just before dawn, they throw his corpse, wrapped in plastic, over a guardrail and onto a street below. Elizabeth gives his corpse one final kiss before they place it in Elizabeth's car to dispose of outside of town. The women flee in Elizabeth's car, Valerie driving at a high speed to cross over the border to France. Elizabeth insists that she not be caught in daylight. While speeding on a dense forest road, the women are blinded by sunlight, and Valerie loses control of the car, crashing. Elizabeth is thrown from the vehicle and impaled through the heart on a broken branch before her body is lit on fire by the car's subsequent explosion.

Several months later, Valerie approaches a young couple playing tennis at a resort for new prey, her voice now that of Elizabeth's.

Cast
 Delphine Seyrig as Countess Elizabeth Báthory
 Danielle Ouimet as Valerie Chilton
 John Karlen as Stefan Chilton
 Andrea Rau as Ilona
 Paul Esser as Pierre
 Georges Jamin as Retired Policeman
 Joris Collet as Butler
 Fons Rademakers as Mother

Production
Director Kumel, interviewed by Mark Gatiss for the BBC documentary Horror Europa said that he deliberately styled Delphine Seyrig's character after Marlene Dietrich and Andrea Rau's after Louise Brooks to deepen the intertextual resonance. Because the vampire character of Elizabeth Bathory is also a demagogue, Kumel dressed her in the Nazi colours of black, white and red. In commenting on both the film's mordant sense of humour and the director's painterly eye in the composition of several scenes, Gatiss drew forth the comment from Kumel that he considers the film very Belgian, especially due to the influence of Surrealism and Expressionism.

Extensive external shooting was done at the Royal Galleries of Ostend, a seaside neoclassical arcade on the beach at Ostend (especially at the luxury Grand Hotel des Thermes, which sits atop the central section of the arcade). The interior shooting was done at the Hotel Astoria, Brussels and other exteriors at the Tropical Gardens, Meise.

Interpretation
The critic Camille Paglia writes in Sexual Personae (1990) that Daughters of Darkness is a good example of a "classy genre of vampire film" that "follows a style I call psychological high Gothic." Paglia sees this "abstract and ceremonious" style, which depicts evil as "hierarchical glamour" and deals with "eroticized western power", as beginning in Samuel Taylor Coleridge's poem Christabel, Edgar Allan Poe's short story "Ligeia", and Henry James's novella The Turn of the Screw.

According to the critic Geoffrey O'Brien:

Lesbian vampires made frequent incursions in the early 1970’s—in movies ranging from hardcore pornographic to dreamily aesthetic — as the Gothic horror movie took to flaunting its psychosexual subtexts. Daughters of Darkness leans flamboyantly toward the artistic end of the spectrum, with Delphine Seyrig sporting Marienbad-like costumes and the Belgian director conjuring up images of luxurious decadence replete with feathers, mirrors, and long, winding hotel corridors. At the film’s core, however, is a deeply unpleasant evocation of a war of nerves between Seyrig’s vampire and the bourgeois newlyweds into whose honeymoon she insinuates herself. Jaded age preys cunningly on narcissistic youth, and seductiveness and cruelty become indistinguishable as Seyrig forces the innocents to become aware of their own capacity for monstrous behavior. If Fassbinder had made a vampire movie it might have looked something like this.

Release
The film first opened in the United States in New York City, premiering on 28 May 1971.

Critical reception
In the early 2010s, Time Out conducted a poll with several authors, directors, actors and critics who have worked within the horror genre to vote for their top horror films. Daughters of Darkness placed at number 90 on their top 100 list. The movie rating aggregator Rotten Tomatoes rates the movie with 80% on 20 ratings.

Notes

References

External links
 
 
 
 
 Daughters of Darkness trailer at Archive.org

1971 films
1971 horror films
1971 LGBT-related films
1970s erotic films
1970s exploitation films
1970s English-language films
1970s French films
1970s German films
Belgian erotic films
Belgian horror films
Belgian LGBT-related films
Cultural depictions of Elizabeth Báthory
English-language Belgian films
English-language French films
English-language German films
Erotic horror films
Films directed by Harry Kümel
Films scored by François de Roubaix
Films set in Belgium
Films shot in Bruges
French erotic films
French LGBT-related films
French vampire films
German erotic films
German LGBT-related films
German vampire films
Gothic horror films
LGBT-related horror films
West German films